Yousef Ahmad (born 1955 in Doha, Qatar) is a Qatari artist, art adviser, collector, writer and educator in the field of art. He is a leading figure of Qatar's cultural development and regularly represent his country at international biennials and events. His art work has been displayed internationally.

Early life and education
Ahmad was born in Al Jasrah, a suburb of Doha, to a family of 3 sisters and 2 brothers. His mother was Maryam Al Baker, and his father, Ahmad Al-Homaid, worked as a pearl diver before joining Qatar Petroleum.

By the time Ahmad finished primary school, the Ministry of Education began offering scholarships to Qatari artists to study abroad in Europe and the Middle East. He received a BA in Fine Art and Education from Helwan University in 1976. He studied under Gazbia Sirry during part of his tenure. He obtained a Master of Fine Arts degree from Mills College in California in 1982.

Career as an artist
His works have been described as realistic, because they document the local Qatari environment and traditions of its people. He became active in creating unique abstract paintings of Arabic calligraphy, which he develops through his personal interpretation of Arabic script. Since 1974, he has used textiles in his art works. These are primarily old-fashioned fabrics, which he feels is representative of what his ancestors wore.

He is particularly known for producing large-scale works, using a wide range of colors and materials. Various natural landscapes, such as deserts, marshes and ponds, are usually the main subjects of his paintings. He states that such themes reflect on Al Jasrah, the neighborhood where he grew up.  In 1977, he became the first Qatari artist to have a solo exhibition dedicated to huryfiyya art in Doha.

He has been teaching art appreciation at Qatar University for more than twenty years. He also published a book, in 1986. It is called Al-Funoon at-Tashkeeliyyah al-Mu'aasirah fee Qatar (Contemporary Fine Arts in Qatar), and it documents pioneering artists, organizations and institutions at the time.

Career in Qatari government
After his graduation, he was first appointed as manager of the Culture and Arts Department within the Ministry of Information.

While he was teaching at Qatar University, Ahmad met Sheikh Hassan bin Mohamed bin Ali Al Thani. He worked with him to collect significant works of Arab art from Qatar and abroad. This led to the creation of the Orientalist Museum and Mathaf: Arab Museum of Modern Art.

Awards
Baghdad International Festival for Arts
Winner: 1986

Ankara Biennial
Referee's Award: 1986

GCC Artists Exhibitions
Gold Palm-Leaf: 1989, 1991, 1996, 1999

First Tourists Exhibition (Doha)
First prize: 1993

Cairo Biennale
Referee's Award: 1996, 1998

Al Kharafi First International Biennial of Contemporary Arab Art
Referee's Award: 2006

See also
 Collecting practices of the Al-Thani Family
 Hurufiyya movement
 Islamic art
 Islamic calligraphy

External links
 About Yousef Ahmad
 Yousef Ahmad on artnet

References

1955 births
Qatari art collectors
Qatari writers
Qatari painters
Living people
Qatari contemporary artists
People from Doha
Helwan University alumni